were officials of the Tokugawa shogunate with responsibility for holding and defending Sunpu Castle (Sunpu-jō), also called Shizuoka Castle.

Appointments to the prominent office of castle warden at Sunpu Domain were exclusively fudai daimyōs. Conventional interpretations have construed this Japanese titles as "commissioner" or "overseer" or "governor".

List of Sunpu jōdai

 Toki Tomoaki, 1859–1863.

See also
 Bugyō

Notes

References
 Beasley, William G. (1955).  Select Documents on Japanese Foreign Policy, 1853–1868. London: Oxford University Press. [reprinted by RoutledgeCurzon, London, 2001.   (cloth)]
 Brinkley, Frank et al.. (1915).  A History of the Japanese People from the Earliest Times to the End of the Meiji Era.  New York: Encyclopædia Britannica.

Government of feudal Japan
Officials of the Tokugawa shogunate